Amber Slagle (born July 7, 1996) is an American professional stock car racing driver, crew chief, and engineer. She competes part-time in the ARCA Menards Series and ARCA Menards Series East, driving the No. 24 Chevrolet SS for McGowan Motorsports, and part-time in the ARCA Menards Series West, driving the No. 17 Chevrolet SS for the same team.

Racing career

Early career 
Slagle began racing at seven years old after her father bought her a quarter midget. She won the Dixie Motor Speedway Female Driver of the Year award three times, from 2007 to 2009, where she also won Rookie of the Year in 2007. She won the Owosso Speedway track championship in 2011, while also winning the "Got Game" award.

She moved up to the Champion Racing Association in 2014, posting her best finish of 14th at Salem Speedway that year, and would get that same finish the following year at Springport Mid-Michigan Speedway. Slagle would put her racing career on hold in 2016 after the money for the tour became more expensive. 

She made her return in 2017, starting 20th and finishing 16th at Owosso Speedway. 

Amber moved south in 2018, questioning if she would ever race in a late model again. She got the opportunity with Cook-Finley Racing, and would drive part-time late model races in the Southeast Limited Late Model Series, and would drive in the NASCAR Advance Auto Parts Weekly Series from 2019 to 2020.

Crew chief 
In 2021, Slagle became the crew chief for Cook-Finley Racing and Parker Retzlaff in the ARCA Menards Series East. They've earned 1 top 5, and 4 top 10s that season.

ARCA Menards Series West 
On June 7, 2021, Slagle announced that she will make her ARCA Menards Series West debut with Steve McGowen Motorsports at Irwindale Speedway. She started 4th and would finish 14th. She made two more starts that year, posting her first career top 10 at the All American Speedway.

Motorsports career results

ARCA Menards Series
(key) (Bold – Pole position awarded by qualifying time. Italics – Pole position earned by points standings or practice time. * – Most laps led.)

ARCA Menards Series East

ARCA Menards Series West
(key) (Bold – Pole position awarded by qualifying time. Italics – Pole position earned by points standings or practice time. * – Most laps led.)

Personal life 
Slagle currently resides in Sylvan Lake, Michigan, and is currently a mechanic for Cook-Finley Racing.

References

External links 

1996 births
ARCA Menards Series drivers
Living people
NASCAR drivers
Racing drivers from Detroit
Racing drivers from Michigan
Sportspeople from Michigan